The America Award is a lifetime achievement literary award for international writers. It describes itself as a modest attempt at providing alternatives to the Nobel Prize in Literature. It was first presented in 1994. The award does not entail any prize money. It is sponsored by the Contemporary Arts Educational Project, Inc., in loving memory of Anna Fahrni, and by the publisher Green Integer.

Jury

Each year, the jury comprises 6 to 8 American poets, prose writers, playwrights and literary critics. The rotating panel has included Douglas Messerli [chairman], Will Alexander, Luigi Ballerini, Charles Bernstein, Peter Constantine, Peter Glassgold, Deborah Meadows, Martin Nakell, John O'Brien, Marjorie Perloff, Dennis Phillips, Joe Ross, Jerome Rothenberg, Paul Vangelisti, and Mac Wellman.

Recipients

1994 – Aimé Cesaire [Martinique]
1995 – Harold Pinter [UK]
1996 – José Donoso [Chile] (awarded prior to his death)
1997 – Friederike Mayröcker [Austria]
1998 – Rafael Alberti [Spain] (awarded prior to his death)
1999 – Jacques Roubaud [France]
2000 – Eudora Welty [USA]
2001 – Inger Christensen [Denmark]
2002 – Peter Handke [Austria]
2003 – Adonis [Syria/Lebanon]
2004 – José Saramago [Portugal]
2005 – Andrea Zanzotto [Italy]
2006 – Julien Gracq (Louis Poirier) [France]
2007 – Paavo Haavikko [Finland]
2008 – John Ashbery [USA]
2009 – Günter Kunert [Germany]
2010 – Javier Marías [Spain]
2011 – Ko Un [South Korea]
2012 – Ivo Michiels [Belgium]
2013 – Reiner Kunze [GDR/Germany]
2014 – László Krasznahorkai [Hungary]
2015 – Edward Albee [USA]
2016 – César Aira [Argentina]
2017 – Tom Stoppard [Czechoslovakia/UK]
2018 – Haruki Murakami [Japan]
2019 – Nicole Brossard [Canada]
2020 – Mario Vargas Llosa [Peru]
2021 – Rosmarie Waldrop [Germany/USA]
2022 – Gerhard Rühm [Austria]

References

America
Awards established in 1994
1994 establishments in the United States
Literary awards honoring lifetime achievement